The White Peacock is the first novel by D. H. Lawrence, published in 1911, though with 1910 on the title page. Lawrence started the novel in 1906 and then rewrote it three times. The early versions had the working title of Laetitia.

Maurice Greiffenhagen's 1891 painting 'An Idyll' inspired the novel. The painting had "a profound effect" on Lawrence, who wrote: "As for Greiffenhagen's 'Idyll', it moves me almost as if I were in love myself. Under its intoxication, I have flirted madly this Christmas."

The novel is set in the Eastwood area of his youth and is narrated in the first person by a character named Cyril Beardsall. It involves themes such as the damage associated with mismatched marriages, and the border country between town and country. A misanthropic gamekeeper makes an appearance, in some ways the prototype of Mellors in Lawrence's last novel, Lady Chatterley's Lover. The book includes some notable description of nature and the impact of industrialisation on the countryside and the town.

Plot 
The novel is set in Nethermere (fictional name for real-life Eastwood) and is narrated by Cyril Beardsall, whose sister Laetitia (Lettie) is involved in a love triangle with two young men, George and Leslie Temple. She eventually marries Leslie, even though she feels sexually drawn to George. Spurned by Lettie, George marries the conventional Meg. Both his and Lettie's marriages end in unhappiness, as George slides into alcoholism at the novel's close.

Publication history 
The White Peacock was published on January 19, 1911 by Duffield & Co. in the United States and a day later by Heinemann in the United Kingdom.

Reception 
According to the biographer Brenda Maddox, The White Peacock received generally positive reviews in The Observer, The Morning Post, and The Daily News.

Maddox writes in that The White Peacock reflects the influence of the German philosophers Arthur Schopenhauer and Friedrich Nietzsche, and that its theme is "that Christianity has alienated humankind from nature and destroyed pagan wisdom". Maddox describes it as "an uneven early work obscured by Lawrence's later books", but praises it for its "beauty and power" and for being "rich in images of a nature red in tooth and claw." She argues that while Lawrence's works have been seen as Freudian, the "primitive rage against mothers" in The White Peacock better fits the ideas of the psychoanalyst Melanie Klein. She maintains that the novel has homoerotic elements, apparent in the relationship between George and Cyril, and notes that the novelist E. M. Forster saw it as having sexual implications unrecognised by Lawrence.

References

Editions 
 The White Peacock (1911), edited by Andrew Robertson, Cambridge University Press, 1983,

External links
 
 
 Facsimile of the 1st edition (1911)

1911 British novels
1911 debut novels
Heinemann (publisher) books
Novels by D. H. Lawrence
Novels set in Nottinghamshire